The 2018 Gabon Championnat National D1 is the 50th season in top-flight football in Gabon.

The 2017–18 season was scheduled to start on 28 October 2017, but was postponed indefinitely. It eventually started on 20 January 2018. It ended on 13 June 2018 with the final.

Standings
Final table (regular season finished after 10 rounds on 6 June 2018; top four advance to play-off).

Semi-finals
10 June 2018

Lozo Sport FC 1-2 AS Mangasport

US Bitam 1-1 AO Cercle Mbéri Sportif [4-5 pen]

Third place match
13 June 2018

US Bitam 6-0 Lozo Sport FC

Final
13 June 2018

AO Cercle Mbéri Sportif 0-2 AS Mangasport

References

External links

Standings

Gabon Championnat National D1 seasons
Championnat National D1
Gabon